Shahid Rajai Stadium is a multi-use stadium in Qazvin, Iran. It is used for football matches and is home ground of Caspian Qazvin F.C. The stadium holds 15,000 people. It is named after Iran's second president, Mohammad-Ali Rajai, who was from Qazvin.

References

AFC Asian Cup stadiums
Football venues in Iran
Buildings and structures in Qazvin Province
Sport in Qazvin Province